Provincial Archives of New Brunswick is the archives agency for the Canadian province of New Brunswick. It is located on the campus of the University of New Brunswick in Fredericton, New Brunswick, Canada.

References

External links

Crown corporations of New Brunswick
Archives in Canada
State archives